P. Gopalan (16 July 1906 - 31 March 1986) was an Indian politician and leader of Communist Party of India. He represented Punalur constituency in 1st KLA. He was also Member at Travancore Cochin Legislative Assembly from 1954 to 1956.

References

Communist Party of India politicians from Kerala